Excalibur is the first Czech video gaming magazine. It was published by Martin Ludvík and led by Lukáš Ladra.

References

External sources 

 Founder's blog about the magazine

Video game magazines published in the Czech Republic